Cristian Daniel Ledesma (born 24 September 1982) is an Argentine-born Italian retired footballer who played as a central midfielder. He is currently working as a youth coach for Frosinone.

A dual citizen of Argentina and Italy, he appeared with the latter's national team in November 2010.

Ledesma is perhaps best known for his nine years at Italian club Lazio, where he was involved in two Coppa Italia wins. He is a deep lying central midfield playmaker with good vision, passing, and technique; he also possesses a powerful shot with either foot, despite being naturally right-footed, and occasionally scores goals from long range.

Club career

Early career
Born in Morón, Buenos Aires, Ledesma grew up in Puerto Madryn, in the province of Chubut. He later returned to the capital, joining the youth system of Boca Juniors in 1997 at the age of 14.

In 2001 Ledesma moved to Italy and joined Lecce, whose sporting director Pantaleo Corvino decided to bring him to Salento. Initially assigned to the Primavera squad, he made his first team – and Serie A – debut on 10 March 2002, starting in a 1–2 away loss against Atalanta.

After suffering relegation, Ledesma was definitely promoted to the main squad. He scored his first goal for the club on 1 December 2002, netting the last in a 1–1 Serie B draw at Hellas Verona.

Ledesma appeared in 29 matches during the campaign, as Lecce returned to the top tier at first attempt. He scored his first goal in the main category on 9 November 2003, netting his team's second in a 2–2 away draw against Perugia.

Ledesma was an ever-present figure for the Giallorossi during the following campaigns, being also captain.

Lazio
In July 2006, after suffering another relegation, Ledesma signed a four-year deal with Lazio, for a €5.3 million fee. He made his debut for the club on 19 August 2006, starting in a 4–0 Coppa Italia home routing of Rende.

During his first season in the capital, Ledesma established himself as a key player despite a difficult start. His first moment of magic came in the December 2006 Derby della Capitale against historical rivals AS Roma, when he scored a strike from 25 metres out. He continued this good form until the end of the season, by which time Lazio had qualified for the UEFA Champions League. He successively served as vice-captain, and was a protagonist in Lazio's winning Coppa Italia 2008–09 campaign.

In July 2009, with his contract set to expire in the following year, Ledesma was excluded from the first team due to disagreements with club chairman Claudio Lotito and did not play any competitive games during the whole first half of the 2009–10 season. This led the player to formally ask the Lega Calcio arbitration committee for a contract termination due to violation of its terms, only a few weeks after teammate Goran Pandev had taken the same exact action.

This was however turned down on 26 January 2010 on the grounds that Ledesma was occasionally involved in first-team activities. After being linked with a move to Internazionale, he ultimately stayed at Lazio and, immediately after the replacement of head coach Davide Ballardini with veteran manager Edoardo Reja, he made his 2009–10 season debut on 14 February, being featured in the starting lineup in a 2–0 win at Parma. Since his return on the pitch, Ledesma immediately established himself back into being a key player for the biancazzurri.

On 23 August 2010, Ledesma signed a new contract with Lazio, extending his link until 2015. In his 2010–11 campaign, he was one of the protagonists of Lazio's surprising start that led the Rome club to even top the Serie A table for a few weeks between October and November. Lazio ended their 2011–12 season campaign qualifying once again for Europa League and only just missing out to Udinese by goal difference in a Champions League spot.

On 1 July 2015 Ledesma was released, after not having his contract renewed. He appeared in 318 matches and scored 14 goals for Lazio, being honoured by the club after his departure.

Santos
On 28 August 2015 Ledesma agreed to a contract with Brazilian club Santos. He made his debut for the club on 18 October, coming on as a second-half substitute for Renato in a 3–1 home win against Goiás.

On 6 January 2016, after being rarely used, Ledesma rescinded his contract.

Panathinaikos
On 14 July 2016, Panathinaikos have officially announced the transfer of Argentinian midfielder. The 33-year-old centre midfielder, who played for Santos last season, has signed a two-year contract with the Greens, for an undisclosed fee. On 18 August 2016,Lendesma along with Marcus Berg was the scorer of goal from the penalty spot, helping Panathinaikos win the first leg of the Europa League playoffs and is set to qualify for the group stage, as the Greens crushed Danish Brøndby IF 3–0 at Leoforos stadium. On 2 October 2016, he scored with two penalty kicks helping his club to achieve a 3–1 home win against Asteras Tripoli for the 4th day of the 2016–17 season.

On 28 December 2016, as expected, Panathinaikos have parted ways with Ledesma. The Greens have officially announced the news, while the 34-year-old midfielder seems to be heading to Italy.

Ternana

Lugano

Pro Piacenza
On 5 September 2018 Ledesma returned to Italy once again for Serie C club Pro Piacenza. Pro Piacenza experienced financial difficulties in late 2018 and all the players were released from contracts.

International career
Ledesma acquired Italian citizenship in 2008 through marriage to an Italian woman he met during his spell at Lecce; this made him eligible at international level for both Argentina and the Italy (Azzurri), as he had never been capped with the Selección before.

On 14 November 2010 Ledesma accepted a call-up by Italy manager Cesare Prandelli for a friendly match against Romania, thus becoming the third oriundo to become part of the Azzurri senior squad in the last ten years, the other two being Mauro Camoranesi and Amauri.

Coaching career
Ledesma confirmed in the summer 2019 that he had retired from football and would continue as a coach for the Ledesma Academy, where he should be in charge of training children from 5 to 15 years.

In September 2019 he took over on his first role as a first team manager, coaching Promozione amateurs LUISS, the football branch of the Libera Università Internazionale degli Studi Sociali Guido Carli. He left the club in October 2021, overseeing a promotion to Eccellenza. In March 2022 he was named new head coach of Eccellenza amateur side Cimini.

In July 2022, Ledesma joined Frosinone as a youth coach in charge of the Under-17 team.

Career statistics

Club

International

Honours
Lazio
 Coppa Italia: 2008–09, 2012–13
 Supercoppa Italiana: 2009

References

External links
 Official Lazio Club Profile
 Official FIGC Profile  
  
 

1982 births
Living people
People from Morón Partido
Sportspeople from Buenos Aires Province
Naturalised citizens of Italy
Argentine emigrants to Italy
Italian footballers
Argentine footballers
Association football midfielders
Serie A players
Serie B players
U.S. Lecce players
S.S. Lazio players
A.S. Pro Piacenza 1919 players
Campeonato Brasileiro Série A players
Santos FC players
Panathinaikos F.C. players
Super League Greece players
Italy international footballers
Argentine expatriate footballers
Italian expatriate footballers
Argentine expatriate sportspeople in Italy
Argentine expatriate sportspeople in Brazil
Italian expatriate sportspeople in Brazil
Expatriate footballers in Italy
Expatriate footballers in Brazil
Expatriate footballers in Greece
FC Lugano players
Expatriate footballers in Switzerland